Tortelli cremaschi (dialect of Crema: turtèi cremasch) represents the main dish of the local culinary tradition cremasca. While tortelli typically have a savoury filling, that of tortelli cremaschi is sweet and cannot be found elsewhere in Italy.

Origins

The tortelli cremaschi may have been born during the long Republic of Venice . In support of this theory there are at least two factors: the first is that nowadays it's a typical dish known only in the city of Crema, actually within the borders of the ancient territory of Crema which belonged to Venice. The second one due to the ingredients of the filling: amaretti biscuits, spices, candied fruit and raisins are all goods which came from the trades with the Orient, which were under the monopoly of the Venetians for centuries.

The modern recipe dates from the end of the 19th century.

Custom

The tortelli represent, in Crema, the most important dish of a celebration; they are usually prepared for festivals, weddings or other family events; however they aren't Christmas or Easter food and virtually every village and every family has its own recipe, slightly different from the next.

Shape 

It appears that the shape of the tortelli is unique in Italian gastronomy: a small amount of filling is placed in the middle of a small circle of dough, which is then folded over into a half-moon, the edges superimposed by hand and pinched together to create five crests. In some villages, people make them in a square and use a fork to press them closed, but this does not conform to the tradition. The "cremaschi" of ancient times said that the use of the fork was used by countrymen to save money, in that there would have been no waste of dough.

Ingredients

The tortelli have a balance of flavors, with a sweet and spicy filling, while traditional pasta and condiments are savory, gelatinous and fatty. They have to be formed in rather thick envelopes of pasta and cooked for a relatively long time, from 20 to 40 minutes. 
Egg pasta is not suitable here because, in cooking, it tends to lose the filling.

Dough

 Flour
 Water (or milk)
 Salt
 One egg for each kilo of flour (the egg aids in the binding of the dough)

To prepare the dough, one adds all the flour to lightly salted hot water and kneads until an elastic ball is formed; at the end of the kneading the colour should be a light grey. If desired one could use a pasta maker adding only one egg for each kilo of flour, and a spoonful of oil to give more elasticity to the mixture. Any recipe that uses more than one egg per kilo of flour is not considered traditional and does not work well.

Filling
 Amaretto biscuits crumbed (the "Gallina" brand is the only one favored by the "cremaschi")
 Breadcrumbs, but only for drying an excessively moist filling.
 Candied citrus peel
 Nutmeg
 Mostaccino, spicy biscuit, typical of Crema
 Egg yolks
 Salt
 Grated Grana Padano cheese
 Grated lemon skin
 Marsala
 Mint candies (no more than four for each kilo of flour) 
 Raisin, soaked to soften

Some people add meat or broth, but such don't belong to the traditional recipe.

To prepare the filling, pour it in a mixing bowl and then add the crumbed amaretti biscuits, the softened and dried raisin, the crumbled Mostaccino biscuit, the grated mint candies, grated citrus peel, grated cheese, the egg yolk, the lemon skin, a bit of breadcrumbs, the Marsala and if necessary a bit of broth to make the mixture softer. Let it stand in the fridge for an entire day. The following day prepare the dough and let it rest in a wrapped in a cloth for about an hour; stretch it out to create circles, parcel out the individual filling portions and fold them into half moon shaped pockets of dough, minding to press the edges three times. Cook in salted boiling water stirring gently occasionally, to prevent the tortelli from sticking together.

Condiment
High quality butter, lightly warmed to melt or fried with sage; some people use uncooked or barely melted butter.
Layer the tortelli in a wide soup tureen, wetting them with the condiment and adding the grated Grana cheese, let them rest for a few minutes before serving.

See also
Spongarda
Torta Bertolina
Treccia d'oro

References
 Daniela Bianchessi and Roberta Schira, Mangià Nustrà, Grafin, s.d., ISBN not found
 Francesco Piantelli, Folclore Cremasco, 2nd edition Arti Grafiche Cremasche, Crema. 1985,   Crema, Publishing House Vinci, 1951.

Pasta dishes